The 1970 winners of the Torneo di Viareggio (in English, the Viareggio Tournament, officially the Viareggio Cup World Football Tournament Coppa Carnevale), the annual youth football tournament held in Viareggio, Tuscany, are listed below.

Format

The 16 teams are organized in knockout rounds. The round of 16 are played in two-legs, while the rest of the rounds are single tie.

Participating teams
Italian teams

  Atalanta
  Fiorentina
  Inter Milan
  Juventus
  Lanerossi Vicenza
  Milan
  Roma
  Torino

European teams

  Bayern München
  Dukla Praha
  Partizan Beograd
  Rijeka
  CSKA Sofia
  Benfica
  Steaua București

American teams
  Boca Juniors

Tournament fixtures

Champions

Footnotes

External links
 Official Site (Italian)
 Results on RSSSF.com

1970
1969–70 in Italian football
1969–70 in Yugoslav football
1969–70 in German football
1969–70 in Czechoslovak football
1969–70 in Portuguese football
1969–70 in Romanian football
1970 in Argentine football
1969–70 in Bulgarian football